NRI or Nri may refer to :
 Kingdom of Nri, an Igbo kingdom that flourished between the 10th century and early 20th century
 National Radio Institute, a now defunct post-secondary vocational correspondence school
 National Resources Inventory
 Needham Research Institute
 Networked Readiness Index
 Nomura Research Institute
 Non-resident Indian
 Non-roster invitee
 Norepinephrine reuptake inhibitor